Weatherford High School is a public high school located in Weatherford, Texas, United States. It is part of the Weatherford Independent School District located in central Parker County and classified as a 6A school by the University Interscholastic League (UIL).  In 2015, the school was rated "Met Standard" by the Texas Education Agency.

Athletics
The Weatherford Kangaroos compete in these sports - 

Cross Country, Volleyball, Football, Basketball, Wrestling, Powerlifting, Soccer, Golf, Tennis, Track, Softball, and Baseball.

State Titles
Softball 
2000(4A)

State Finalists
Baseball 
1982(4A)
Softball 
1999(4A)

Notable alumni
Zach Britton – MLB pitcher
Beau Burrows – pitcher in the Detroit Tigers organization
Blair Cherry – baseball and football coach at University of Texas-Austin
Hank Gremminger – NFL defensive back (1956–66)
Larry Hagman – film and television actor, best known for starring in TV series Dallas and I Dream of Jeannie
Colt Hynes – MLB pitcher
Kapron Lewis-Moore - NFL defensive end
Ray Schoenke – NFL player and entrepreneur
Brina Palencia – actress and voice actress
Drew Springer, Jr. – Texas Senator, 30th district.

References

External links
Weatherford ISD

Schools in Parker County, Texas
Public high schools in Texas